A metal leaf, also called composition leaf or schlagmetal, is a thin foil used for gilding and other forms of decoration. Metal leaves can come in many different shades. Some metal leaves may look like gold leaf but do not contain any real gold. This type of metal leaf is often referred to as imitation leaf.

Metal leaves are usually made of gold (including many alloys), silver, copper, aluminium, brass (sometimes called "Dutch metal" typically 85% Copper and 15% zinc) or palladium, sometimes also platinum.

Vark is a type of silver leaf used for decoration in Indian cuisine.

Goldbeating, the technique of producing metal leaves, has been known for more than 5,000 years. A small gold nugget 5 mm in diameter can be expanded to about 20,000 times its initial surface through hammering, producing a gold foil surface of about one half square meter with a thickness of 0.2–0.3 μm.

Nanjing gold leaf forging technique

History
This is a traditional handicraft in Nanjing, produced as early as  the Three Kingdoms and Two Jin Dynasties; it  was used in Buddha statue manufacturing and construction. It was   widely used in the gilding of Buddha statues and idols and the construction industry during the Eastern Wu and Eastern Jin Dynasties.

During the Qing Dynasty, (1640-1912) the technology developed, and Nanjing gold leaf was sold overseas. It retains traditional smelting, hand-beating and other techniques, and the gold leaf is pure, uniform and soft. On May 20, 2006, it was included in the first batch of national intangible cultural heritage representative items.

Modern gold leaf artists combine ancient traditional crafts with modern technology to make traditional gold leaf. Forging skills are more sophisticated.

Nanjing Gold foil forging technology. 
The gold foil production in Nanjing follows the ancient production process. The forging process has been tempered by more than a dozen processes such as gold bar, leaf beat, twisting, opening, assembly, issuing, and foil cutting. It is also called "playing gold leaf." According to the needs of different products, a proportion of silver and copper is added; the metal is then melted into liquid, poured into an iron tank and cooled to form gold bars, hammered into thin slices, cut into small gold pieces, and then covered with gold foil and hammered into gold foil repeatedly at high temperature.

Gallery of gold leaf

See also
 Professional Picture Framers Association

References

Gold
Visual arts materials